Super 7 may refer to:

 Lotto Super 7, a former Canadian lottery game (its final drawing was September 18, 2009)
 Lotus Seven, a kit car produced by Lotus
 Super Socket 7, a CPU socket
 Tarzan and the Super 7, an animated television series also later known as Batman and the Super 7
 Los Super Seven, a Latin American music group
 Super 7, a lathe manufactured by Myford
 Super-7, a line of rebuilt railroad locomotives marketed by GE Transportation Systems
 Super 7, a Pennsylvania Lottery game offered from 1986 to 1995; brought back in 2009 in a modified version
 Super 7, an early name for the Chinese/Pakistani JF-17 fighter aircraft